The 2012 Intercity Football League was the sixth season of the Intercity Football League since its establishment in 2007. Taipower FC were the defending champions, having won the league for the 3rd time last season. 

The league was decided on the last day of the season. Despite losing 1-0 to Tatung FC, Taipower FC clinched their 4th league title due to their superior goal difference, and in doing so qualified for the 2013 AFC President's Cup.

Standings

References

External links
Chinese Taipei Football Association
FIFA.com standings
Soccerway: Inter City League 2012

Top level Taiwanese football league seasons
Intercity Football League seasons
Taipei
Taipei
1